Bindahara phocides, the plane, is a small butterfly found Indomalayan (including Sri Lanka, India) and Australasian realms that belongs to the lycaenids or blues family.

Description

Subspecies
The subspecies are:
B. p. phocides Sikkim - Myanmar, South Yunnan
B. p. fumata (Röber, 1887) Sulawesi, Talaud, Banggai, Sula
B. p. moorei Fruhstorfer, 1904 Sri Lanka, south India
"Male and female, similar to the nominate subspecies above and below in both sexes, except that on the upperside of the hindwing there is a narrow, terminal blue-green band from near the apex to vein 2."
B. p. phocas Staudinger, 1889 Palawan
B. p. chromis (Mathew, 1887) Bismarck Archipelago, Solomons
B. p. isabella (Felder, 1860) Cape York - Townsvill
B. p. origenes Fruhstorfer, 1912 Philippines (Mindanao)

Biology
The larva feeds on Salacia.

Gallery

See also
List of butterflies of India (Lycaenidae)

References

 
 
 
 
 
 

Deudorigini
Butterflies of Asia
Butterflies of Singapore